Ezekia Dibogo Wenje (born 2 October 1978) is a Tanzanian politician and part of the CHADEMA center-right political party in Tanzania and Member of Parliament for Nyamagana constituency since 2010.

References

1978 births
Living people
Chadema MPs
Tanzanian MPs 2010–2015
Geita Secondary School alumni
St. Augustine University of Tanzania alumni
Tanzanian schoolteachers